Banbueng Municipal Stadium is a multi-purpose stadium in Chonburi Province, Thailand. It is currently used mostly for football matches. The stadium holds 2,000 people.

References

Football venues in Thailand
Multi-purpose stadiums in Thailand
Buildings and structures in Chonburi province
Sport in Chonburi province